Vikas Gupta is an Indian American internet entrepreneur. He is known for having founded Jambool, an online company that was acquiredby Google in August 2010. Gupta has also joined Google as the Head of Consumer Payments  after the acquisition. Prior to founding Jambool, Gupta worked at Amazon.com, where he led the payments and web services groups. His newest venture is Play-i,which he started in November 2012.

Early life
Gupta was born in Haridwar, India where his father worked at Bharat Heavy Electricals as one of the few who worked with computers. When Gupta was 12, his father left his well paying job to start his own small-scale industry in Chandigarh, and grew that business successfully over 20+ years. Gupta attributes his father as the first entrepreneur he knows and his inspiration to become an entrepreneur himself.

Career

Amazon 
In May 1999, Gupta joined Amazon as a software engineer. During the first few years at Amazon, he rebuilt the Amazon payments infrastructure and launched one of the earliest service-oriented architectures within Amazon. In 2003 he joined the newly formed web services team, where he took on the mission to build the payments web service to monetize the web services Amazon was embarking on building. The resulting product was the Amazon Flexible Payments Service. In 2004, Vikas co-founded Amazon's development office in Bangalore, India.

Jambool 
While at Amazon, Gupta met Reza Hussein. Together, they left in 2006 to found Jambool. Jambool started out as an online collaborative research tool. In 2008, Jambool launched Social Gold, a direct payments platform for virtual goods. Over the next two years it grew to the most widely used direct payments platform by social games on Facebook.

Google acquired Jambool in August 2010.

Google 
After the acquisition, Gupta joined Google as the Head of Consumer Payments. During his time at Google, he led the efforts on online payments services. The Social Gold platform was integrated and launched at Google I/O in 2011, to power payments for Chrome web store and Google+. Gupta left Google in January 2012.

Wonder Workshop 
Vikas founded Wonder workshop to focus on one problem: make coding, and learning to code, fun and easy for every child through play.  Wonder Workshop is building robots and software that enables children at all ages to play and code with. Wonder Workshop was launched as Play-i, and renamed to Wonder Workshop in September, 2014.

Patents

References

Living people
Amazon (company) people
Year of birth missing (living people)